Bengally Sylla is a Guinean footballer of the 1970s and 1980s.

A left-winger blessed with abundant pace and skill, Sylla was a star of the highly successful Hafia FC and Guinea sides of the 1970s. He is regarded as being one of Guinea's top players during this period.

Sylla finished fourth in the voting for the 1976 African Footballer of the Year award.

References

External links

Year of birth missing (living people)
Living people
Guinean footballers
Guinea international footballers
1974 African Cup of Nations players
1976 African Cup of Nations players
1980 African Cup of Nations players
Association football wingers
Hafia FC players
Guinean football managers